Rowiński (feminine: Rowińska; plural: Rowińscy) is a Polish surname. Notable people with this surname include:

 Francis Rowinski (1918–1990), American bishop
 Jim Rowinski (born 1961), American basketball player
 Robert Rowiński (born 1984), Polish dancer and choreographer

See also 
 

Polish-language surnames